A.I. Rising (also known as Ederlezi Rising and Ederlezi ébredése) is a 2018 English-language Serbian science fiction film directed by Lazar Bodroža and based on a 1980s short story by Zoran Nešković that was adapted for film by screenwriter Dimitrije Vojnov. The film stars Sebastian Cavazza, Stoya, Marusa Majer and Kirsty Besterman.

Plot
In a socialist world in 2148, the Ederlezi Corporation undertakes a space mission to the Alpha Centauri star system. The corporation selects Milutin, a trained cosmonaut, but demands that he accepts Nimani, an android designed to respond to the cosmonaut's desires and to monitor his performance on the ship. Milutin dislikes the idea as he has had poor experiences with women in the past, but implicitly accepts when he asks what she would look like.

Nimani is activated during the trip and Milutin experiments with her programmed scenarios. He finds her to be too artificial and submissive, unlike the human women he has experienced. Milutin gets bored and creates a scenario where she acts as a young first time lover, in which he rapes her. Milutin discovers that Nimani has a parallel operating system based on experiences shaped by interactions with the user, and that he can remove her pre-programmed constraints if he can get advanced access, which is denied by the ship's onboard computer.  The two become romantically entwined, and after Milutin starts an argument scenario, he finds that she is beginning to act beyond her routines, and reads emotion into the interaction. Determined to find out if her feelings are real or programmed, he forces the ship into a tailspin, which makes the ship's computer grant him advanced access.

He deletes the software embedded in her and rather than being grateful for freeing her from her limitations, she  reacts negatively to his deletion of her root programming, and denies him sex. Milutin fades into a depression after Nimani rejects his advances. In order to maintain the mission objectives, Nimani tries to befriend Milutin and expresses her understanding of Milutin's goal to give her free will and make her more like a human. Realizing that she is the cause of his depression, she chooses to self-destruct to improve Milutin's mental state. Milutin is surprised to see her crying prior to self-destruction, and is told by the ship's computer her crying response prior to self-destruction was not pre-programmed but natural. He is devastated, but is told that he can save her by charging her internal battery, which requires a space walk and possible radiation poisoning. Milutin is able to charge the battery and successfully reactivate Nimani, but collapses prior to seeing Nimani wake. Nimani embraces and kisses Milutin as the ship continues onward. It is unclear whether Milutin survives.

Cast

Reception
According to an OnVideo film review, A.I. Rising is a film that is a "mind-blowing, visually sumptuous space journey [that] will take you... beyond the stars and deep inside your soul." Playwright Dean Haspiel describes the film as, "Adam and Eve in outer space"; entrepreneur Cindy Gallup, an "amazingly atmospheric" film; and author John Scalzi comments that the film is "intriguingly philosophical", according to the official film trailer. Stoya, in the words of Cineuropa reviewer Vladan Petkovic, "turns out to be a talented actress, creating a character that convincingly covers the spectrum between android and human." According to reviewer Jeremy Clarke, the film contains hints of several classic sci-fi films, including Blade Runner, Metropolis, Solaris and 2001: A Space Odyssey and also notes that "there are more than enough CG exterior spaceship shots to satisfy SF buffs, but far more importantly the relationship material tackles some very deep male/female relationship issues." Film reviewer Srdjan Garcevic stated that A.I. Rising is a "visually stunning, ambitious, and timely, examination of love in the age of AI". The film was reviewed by others as well.

A.I. Rising won several awards, including best film, best director and best actor-actress awards at the Belgrade Film Festival, FEST, as well as the Cineplexx Distribution Award at Vienna's "Let's CEE" Film Festival.

See also

 
 
 
 
 
 
 List of artificial intelligence films
 
 
 
 
 Synthetic intelligence - an alternative/opposite term for artificial intelligence
 Weak AI - artificial intelligence that implements a limited part of mind

References
Footnotes

Citations

External links
 Official website
 
 
 Related videos:
 
 A.I. Rising (R-rated trailers; (1:51) & (1:37)
 A.I. Rising (Interview/Stoya) (5:12); (1:21)
 Ederlezi song (3:43); (4:28); (4:22).

2018 films
2018 science fiction films
Android (robot) films
Biorobotics in fiction
Cyberpunk films
2010s dystopian films
2010s English-language films
English-language Serbian films
Films about astronauts
Films set in outer space
Films set in the future
Serbian science fiction films
Space opera films
Films shot in Belgrade
Computational neuroscience